Ornella Muti (born Francesca Romana Rivelli; 9 March 1955) is an Italian actress. She made her film debut as Francesca Cimarosa in the 1970 film La moglie più bella.

Early life
Muti was born in Rome to a Neapolitan journalist father and Ilse Renate Krause, a Baltic German sculptor from Estonia. Her maternal grandparents emigrated from Leningrad (now Saint Petersburg, Russia) to Estonia.

Career 
Muti modeled as a teenager and made her film debut in the 1970 film La moglie più bella (The Most Beautiful Wife). She has primarily worked in Italian films but made her English-speaking film debut as Princess Aura in Flash Gordon in 1980. American movies she appeared in include Love and Money (1982), Casanova (1987), Wait Until Spring, Bandini (1989), A Season of Giants (1990), Oscar (1991), Once Upon a Crime (1992), Somewhere in the City (1998) and To Rome with Love (2012).

In 1999 she insured her breasts for $350,000.

In 2008, Muti introduced her own line of jewellery and subsequently opened several shops around the world. 

In 2015, the Italian court of Pordenone sentenced her to eight months in prison for having cancelled a theatrical performance following a health problem, which did not prevent her from participating in a social dinner with Vladimir Putin in Saint Petersburg in December 2010. She avoided prison by paying the sum of 30,000 euros to the Verdi theater as compensation.

Personal life 
Muti has been married twice, first to Alessio Orano (a fellow actor in The Most Beautiful Wife), from 1975 to 1981. She was married, secondly, to Federico Fachinetti, from 1988 to 1996. Muti has three children: Naike Rivelli (born 1974), a fashion model, singer, and actress; a son, Andrea, and a second daughter, Carolina, both from her marriage to Fachinetti. 

In 1994, she became a resident of Monaco. 

On February 1, 2022, the actress announced that she would like to obtain Russian citizenship. She told TASS: "It would be nice for me to get citizenship, because it is part of my culture associated with my mother. She died this year, and it would be a gift for her." 

In July 2022, Muti was criticised by the far right for supporting the legalisation of cannabis in Italy.

Filmography

Films

Television

References

External links 

;
 .

1955 births
Living people
Actresses from Rome
Italian child actresses
Italian film actresses
Italian television actresses
Italian people of Russian descent
Italian people of Estonian descent
Italian people of Baltic German descent
Nastro d'Argento winners
Ciak d'oro winners
20th-century Italian actresses
21st-century Italian actresses